Iraklis Water Polo Club is the water polo department of G.S. Iraklis multi sport club. It has got teams both men and women. The most successful is the women's team that plays in A1 Ethniki (first division), while the men's team plays in A2 Ethniki (second division).

Women's team
Iraklis Women's Water Polo was founded in 1989.  Since the season 2008-09 plays continuously in A1 Ethniki. The most successful seasons were the two last (2012–13 and 2013–14), when the team finished in third place of the championship.

Recent seasons

Men's team
Iraklis men's team plays in A2 Ethniki (second division). In the previous season (2012–13) played in A2 Ethniki, finishing in 5th place among six teams. Iraklis promoted to A1 Ethniki in 2007-08 season, when it won the first place in A2 Ethniki. In the 2008-09 season played in A1 Ethniki for last time, finishing in the last place. In recent season (2014–15), Iraklis played in Beta Ethniki and it won the rise in A2 Ethniki.

References

External links
 Iraklis Water Polo Club Official page
Hellenic Swimming Federation Tribute A1 Women's Water Polo: Iraklis

Water polo clubs in Greece
Iraklis Thessaloniki
Sports clubs in Thessaloniki